SPCH may refer to:

speechless
ICAO code for Tocache Airport
Space Pirate Captain Harlock

See also
SPCH1
SPCHS (disambiguation)